Odessa High School (OHS) is a public high school located in Odessa, Texas, United States.  It is one of three high schools in the Ector County Independent School District. The full name of the school is Odessa Senior High School. This name was originally to differentiate it from Odessa Junior High School (now known as David Crockett Middle School). Normally, the school is commonly referred to as Odessa High or just OHS.   In 2011, the school was rated "Academically Acceptable" by the Texas Education Agency. On April 17, 2014 Odessa High School was named an AVID National Demonstration School.

The student body of Odessa High School is composed of freshmen (grade 9) through seniors (grade 12).  Freshmen are allowed to compete in varsity athletics with upper grades in all sports. However, this mainly happens in such sports as cross country, swimming, golf, gymnastics, tennis, volleyball, softball and baseball. To date, only two freshmen has competed on the varsity football team.

Athletics
The Odessa Bronchos compete in the following sports:

Cross country, volleyball, football, basketball, powerlifting, swimming, soccer, gymnastics, golf, tennis, track, softball, and baseball.

State titles
Baseball 
1950(All)
Football 
1946(2A)
Boys Track 
1950(2A), 1951(2A), 1952(2A), 1992(5A)

Odessa Blackshear - State Runners-up:  Basketball - 1953(PVIL-3A), 1954(PVIL-3A), 1955(PVIL-3A)

AVID program
The AVID program at OHS is a college preparation course for students. This program was recognized as a National Demonstration School as of April 17, 2014. The AVID committee decided unanimously on this decision. OHS is now a highly ranked AVID school. AVID has an on campus site team along with the AVID faculty. 
 AVID Coordinator- Rita Woodall
 AVID Teacher/Asst. Coordinator - Naomi Fuentes
 AVID Teacher - Tracey Borchardt
 AVID Teacher - Kerina Joy

Mascot
The mascot for Odessa High School is the Odessa Bronchos, with all female teams referred to as "Lady Bronchos." This unique spelling of "Broncho" has resulted in Odessa High being the only high school in Texas with this particular mascot.  The original mascot for the team was the Yellowjackets and the team colors were purple and gold. In 1929, the student body voted 113-0 to change to the "Bronchos". The Bronchos colors were changed to scarlet and white.

Band 

The Odessa High School band has the longest consecutive streak of first division rating in marching contests in the State of Texas, going back 82 years. The band has also been invited to various music festival and contests across the nation. In March 2007, the band was invited to play their marching season selections "Letters from the Front" at the National World War II Memorial in Washington, D.C. In 2004, The Odessa High School Band combined with the band from Permian High School in Odessa to form one of the largest bands ever to march in the Tournament of Roses Parade in Pasadena, California (over 500 members).

The OHS Band was started in 1932 under the direction of G. Ward Moody. Directors Robert L. Maddox and Bill Dean have been the longest tenured directors of the band with 13 years and 22 years respectively. As of July 2018, John Mayo is the director of the band. The Instrumental Music Building at OHS is named in honor of Maddox and the main band hall is named in honor of Dean.

From 1981 through 2006, the band has had at least one member make the Texas All State Band each year. In the 1998-99 school year, eight members were accorded All State honors. Band members also consistently do well at UIL Solo and Ensemble contest.

Culture
Odessa High School students reported ghost sightings and paranormal phenomena at the school for decades, up to 2006, centering around Betty Williams, who was killed during the "Kiss and Kill" homicide in 1961. Mack Herring, her killer, was ruled not guilty by grounds of temporary insanity by a Texas jury as she had asked Herring to kill her. Odessa High's administration applied paint to the school auditorium's windows to counter the ghost story culture. In 2019 CBS 7 Odessa stated "Many believe her ghost still haunts the halls of Odessa High School to this day."

Notable alumni 
Gene Babb, linebacker and fullback for San Francisco 49ers and Dallas Cowboys
Marcus Cannon, offensive tackle for TCU and New England Patriots
Hayden Fry, former head football coach, Southern Methodist University, University of North Texas, University of Iowa
Larry Gatlin, Steve Gatlin, and Rudy Gatlin — Grammy Award-winning country artists
Ronnie Goodwin, football player, Baylor University and Philadelphia Eagles 1963-68
Bradley Marquez, Texas Tech football player and minor league baseball outfielder for the New York Mets, professional football player for Los Angeles Rams
Nolan McCarty, class of 1986, Chair Department of Politics, Princeton University
Derrick Shepard, wide receiver for University of Oklahoma and Dallas Cowboys
Jack Ward, class of 1966, bareback riding champion with two World Championships (1977 and 1978); inducted into Texas Cowboy Hall of Fame on January 13, 2011 in Fort Worth
Stephnie Weir, actress, Mad TV
George E. "Buddy" West (1936–2008), Odessa's representative to Texas Legislature, 1993-2008
Alfred M. Wilson, USMC, class of 1967— posthumous Medal of Honor, KIA in Vietnam
Richard Wortham, college baseball star at University of Texas and former Major League Baseball pitcher

References

External links 
The Real Story About Elizabeth
Odessa High School website
OHS Band
Odessa High Football
Odessa High School Alumni website
Odessa High School vs. San Antonio Jefferson 1946 State Championship Game - TexasBob.com
Ratliff Stadium - TexasBob.com

Schools in Ector County, Texas
Odessa, Texas
Public high schools in Texas
1909 establishments in Texas